Gameshow Marathon can refer to:

Gameshow Marathon (UK game show), a UK television series
Gameshow Marathon (U.S. TV series), an adaptation of the UK version